1-Hexadecene, also known as 1-cetene, is a long-chain hydrocarbon and an alkene with the molecular formula CH2=CH(CH2)13CH3.  It is one of many isomers of hexadecene.  Classified as an alpha-olefin, 1-hexadecene is a colorless liquid.

1-Hexadecene is used as a surfactant in lubricating fluid, a drilling fluid in the boring and drilling industry, and in paper sizing.

However, the high reactivity of 1-hexadecene means that exposure to air could cause oxidation of its surface layer, forming unwanted impurities. It is stored with the use of tank blanketing, and handled in a dry, inert atmosphere.

References

Hexadecene1